Giovanni Rusconi (died 1412) was a Roman Catholic prelate who served as Bishop of Parma (1383–1412).

Biography
In 1383, Giovanni Rusconi was appointed during the papacy of Pope Gregory XII as Bishop of Parma.
He served as Bishop of Parma until his death in Sep 1412.

References

External links and additional sources
 (for Chronology of Bishops) 
 (for Chronology of Bishops) 

14th-century Italian Roman Catholic bishops
15th-century Italian Roman Catholic bishops
Bishops appointed by Pope Gregory XII
1425 deaths